Thomas H. Barlow (1852–?) was an American Major League Baseball player who played catcher and shortstop for three different teams in his four-year career, spent entirely in the National Association. Barlow is credited as the pioneer of the bunt.

Career
He hit well that season, hitting .310, and scored 34 runs. In , he caught 53 games, becoming the second player credited with catching all of his team's games, a feat that has been accomplished just seven times, the latest occurring in  when Mike Tresh caught all 150 of the Chicago White Sox' games.

It was during the  season while playing for the Hartford Dark Blues that he sustained an injury to his side while catching pitcher Cherokee Fisher. Later, when he was being treated at his hotel room, a physician administered a morphine injection, which began his addiction to the drug, and subsequently, he lost his baseball career to it. Barlow documented his troubles in a letter, which is read by actor David Caruso in Ken Burns's 1994 documentary, Baseball. In the letter, he lamented on how he was once the catcher for the Mutuals, and the Atlantics, "but no one would know it by looking at me now." He also said "I'd had rather died behind the bat, than have had that first dose." Currently, there is no information of his life after baseball, to include where he lived, or where he died. He can be found in the 1880 census as living with his parents and his occupation is listed as "ball player."

References

External links

1852 births
19th-century baseball players
Baseball players from New York (state)
Major League Baseball catchers
Major League Baseball shortstops
Brooklyn Atlantics players
Hartford Dark Blues players
New Haven Elm Citys players
Year of death unknown